Frame Semantics, a theory of meaning derived from the work of Charles J. Fillmore and others, serves as the foundation for FrameNet (Fillmore 1976, 1977, 1982, 1985, Fillmore and Baker 2001, 2010). The fundamental notion is simple: most words' meanings may be best understood in terms of a semantic frame, which is a description of a certain kind of event, connection, or item and its actors. As an illustration, the idea of cooking normally requires a cook (Cook), the meal being prepared (Food), a container (Container) to store the food while it is being cooked, and a heating instrument (Heating instrument).

The Cook, Food, Heating_instrument, and Container are referred to as frame elements (FEs) in the FrameNet project, which represents this as a frame named Apply_heat. The Apply_heat frame's lexical units (LUs), which include words like fry, bake, boil, and broil, recall this frame. Other frames are simpler, like placing, which only has an agent (or cause), something that is placed (referred to as a Theme), and the place where it is placed. Some frames are more complex, like revenge, which includes more FEs (offender, injury, injured_party, avenger, and punishment). As in the examples of Apply_heat and Revenge below, FrameNet's role is to define the frames and annotate sentences to demonstrate how the FEs fit syntactically around the word that elicits the frame.

Concepts

Frames
A frame is a schematic representation of a situation involving various participants, props, and other conceptual roles. Examples of frame names are Being_born and Locative_relation. A frame in FrameNet contains a textual description of what it represents (a frame definition), associated frame elements, lexical units, example sentences, and frame-to-frame relations.

Frame elements
Frame elements (FE) provide additional information to the semantic structure of a sentence. Each frame has a number of core and non-core FEs which can be thought of as semantic roles. Core FEs are essential to the meaning of the frame while non-core FEs are generally descriptive (such as time, place, manner, etc.).

Some examples include:

 The only core FE of the Being_born frame is called Child; non-core FEs being Time, Place, Relatives, etc.
 Core FEs of the Commerce_goods-transfer include the Seller, Buyer, Goods, among other things, while non-core FEs include a Place, Purpose, etc.

FrameNet includes shallow data on syntactic roles that frame elements play in the example sentences. For example, for a sentence like "She was born about AD 460", FrameNet would mark "She" as a noun phrase referring to the Child FE, and "about AD 460" as a noun phrase corresponding to the Time frame element. Details of how frame elements can be realized in a sentence are important because this reveals important information about the subcategorization frames as well as possible diathesis alternations (e.g. "John broke the window" vs. "The window broke")
of a verb.

Lexical units
Lexical units (LU) are lemmas, with their part of speech, that evoke a specific frame. In other words, when an LU is identified in a sentence, that specific LU can be associated with its specific frame(s). For each frame, there may be many LUs associated to that frame, and also there may be many frames that share a specific LU, this is typically the case with LUs that have multiple word senses. Alongside the frame, each lexical unit is associated with specific frame elements by means of the annotated example sentences.

Example:

Lexical units that evoke the Complaining frame (or more specific perspectivized versions of it, to be precise), include the verbs "complain", "grouse", "lament", and others.

Example sentences
Frames are associated with example sentences and frame elements are marked within the sentences. Thus, the sentence
She was born about AD 460
is associated with the frame Being_born, while "She" is marked as the frame element Child and "about AD 460" is marked as Time.
(See the FrameNet Annotation Report for born.v.)
From the start, the FrameNet project has been committed to looking at evidence from actual language use as found in text collections like the British National Corpus. 
Based on such example sentences, automatic semantic role labeling tools are able to determine frames and mark frame elements in new sentences.

Valences
FrameNet also exposes the statistics on the valences of the frames, that is the number and the position of the frame elements within example sentences. The sentence
She was born about AD 460
falls in the valence pattern
NP Ext, INI --, NP Dep
which occurs two times in the example sentences in FrameNet,
namely in:
She was born about AD 460, daughter and granddaughter of Roman and Byzantine emperors, whose family had been prominent in Roman politics for over 700 years.
He was soon posted to north Africa, and never met their only child, a daughter born 8 June 1941.

Frame relations

FrameNet additionally captures relationships between different frames using relations. These include the following:

 Inheritance: When one frame is a more specific version of another, more abstract parent frame. Anything that is true about the parent frame must also be true about the child frame, and a mapping is specified between the frame elements of the parent and the frame elements of the child.
 Perspectivized_in: A neutral frame (like Commerce_transfer-goods) is connected to a frame with a specific perspective of the same scenario (e.g. the Commerce_sell frame, which assumes the perspective of the seller or the Commerce_buy frame, which assumes the perspective of the buyer)
 Subframe: Some frames like the Criminal_process frame refer to complex scenarios that consist of several individual states or events that can be described by separate frames like Arrest, Trial, and so on.
 Precedes: The Precedes relation captures a temporal order that holds between subframes of a complex scenario.
 Causative_of and Inchoative_of: There is a fairly systematic relationship between stative descriptions (like Position_on_a_scale frame, e.g. "She had a high salary") and causative descriptions (like Cause_change_of_scalar_position frame, e.g. "She raised his salary") or inchoative descriptions (like Change_position_on_a_scale frame, e.g. "Her salary increased").
 Using: A relationship that holds between a frame that in some way involves another frame. For instance, the Judgment_communication frame uses both the Judgment frame and the Statement frame, but does not inherit from either of them because there is no clear correspondence of the frame elements.
 See_also: Connects frames that bear some resemblance but need to be distinguished carefully.

Applications

FrameNet has proven to be useful in a number of computational applications, because computers need additional knowledge in order to recognize that "John sold a car to Mary" and "Mary bought a car from John" describe essentially the same situation, despite using two quite different verbs, different prepositions and a different word order. FrameNet has been used in applications like question answering, paraphrasing, recognizing textual entailment, and information extraction, either directly or by means of Semantic Role Labeling tools. The first automatic system for Semantic Role Labeling (SRL, sometimes also referred to as "shallow semantic parsing") was developed by Daniel Gildea and Daniel Jurafsky based on FrameNet in 2002. Semantic Role Labeling has since become one of the standard tasks in natural language processing, with the latest version (1.7) of FrameNet now fully supported in the Natural Language Toolkit.

Since frames are essentially semantic descriptions, they are similar across languages, and several projects have arisen over the years that have relied on the original FrameNet as the basis for additional non-English FrameNets, for Spanish, Japanese, German, and Polish, among others.

See also
BabelNet: a multilingual semantic network integrating FrameNet
PropBank
Null instantiation
Frame language
UBY: a database of 10 resources including FrameNet

References

Further reading

External links
FrameNet home page
Chinese FrameNet
Danish FrameNet
German FrameNet
Japanese FrameNet
Korean FrameNet
Polish FrameNet
Portuguese FrameNet (Brazil)
Spanish FrameNet
Swedish FrameNet

Lexical databases
Knowledge representation
Corpus linguistics
History of the Internet
Hypertext
Online dictionaries
Science and technology in the San Francisco Bay Area
Computational linguistics